A list of films produced in Spain in 1963 (see 1963 in film).

1963

References

Notes

Bibliography

External links
 Spanish films of 1963 at the Internet Movie Database

1963
Spanish
Films